Robert Overend (December 1930 – 25 June 2017) was a Northern Irish farmer, businessman and Unionist politician. He was also a deputy Grand Master of the Orange Order.

Overend was a prominent member of the Vanguard Unionist Progressive Party in the mid-1970s. In 1975, he proposed that the Order formed a new, united unionist party, but this was rejected. He was elected for Vanguard to the Northern Ireland Constitutional Convention from Mid Ulster, In 1976, an unsuccessful attempt was made on his life by  republican paramilitaries, including Paul McGlinchey, brother of Dominic McGlinchey.

Overend joined the United Ulster Unionist Party (UUUP) on its formation, and was elected to Magherafelt District Council for the new party at the 1977 local elections, holding his seat in 1981 local elections.

Overend stood for the UUUP again at the 1982 Northern Ireland Assembly election, but was not successful. In the run-up to the election, his son, Robert Andrew Overend (born 1957), was seriously injured by an Irish National Liberation Army (INLA) bomb. During the 1990s, he served as Deputy Grand Master of the Orange Order.

Outside politics, he worked as a pig farmer and was chair of the Ulster Pork and Bacon Forum. His daughter-in-law, Sandra Overend, is an Ulster Unionist member of the Northern Ireland Assembly. He also has another two sons and a daughter, Wesley, Nigel and Elizabeth.

Overend died on 25 June 2017, aged 86, following a long illness.

References

1930 births
2017 deaths
Date of birth missing
Grand Masters of the Orange Order
Businesspeople from Northern Ireland
Members of the Northern Ireland Constitutional Convention
Members of Magherafelt District Council
Vanguard Unionist Progressive Party politicians
United Ulster Unionist Party politicians
People from Magherafelt